Sir Howard Douglas Hall, commonly referred to as "The Old Arts Building", is the oldest university building still in use in Canada, completed in 1827. The building is named after Howard Douglas and is located on the Fredericton campus of the University of New Brunswick. The lobby of the building resembles a small museum due to the historic documents and other artifacts stored there. The Edwin Jacob chapel is also located in the lobby. The 'Great Hallways' of this building are filled with history as they are lined with portraits of past presidents of the university.

The building was designated a National Historic Site of Canada in 1951.

Affiliations
The Museum is affiliated with: CMA,  CHIN, and Virtual Museum of Canada.

References

External links
 Sir Howard Douglas Hall 175th Anniversary

Buildings and structures in Fredericton
University of New Brunswick
School buildings completed in 1827
National Historic Sites in New Brunswick
Tourist attractions in Fredericton
1827 establishments in New Brunswick